Fjalar Finnäs (born in 1953) is a Finnish professor of demographics at the Åbo Akademi University.  He is currently focusing on the demographics of the Swedish-speaking Finns. His recent research was in Ethno-Linguistic Exogamy and Divorce.

Researches 

 Mar 2018 - Ethno-Linguistic Exogamy and Divorce
 Aug 2017 - Divorce and parity progression following the death of a child
 Sep 2015 - The Ethno-linguistic Community and Premature Death
 Feb 2014 - Infant mortality and ethnicity in an indigenous European population
 Feb 2014 - Transitions within and from ethno-linguistically mixed and endogamous first unions in Finland
 Jan 2014 - Sex composition of children, parental separation, and parity progression

References

Living people
Demographers
Swedish-speaking Finns
1953 births
Place of birth missing (living people)
Academic staff of Åbo Akademi University